Mustapha El Aouzari is a paralympic athlete from Morocco competing mainly in category T11 middle and long-distance events.

In the 2004 Summer Paralympics Mustapha competed in the T12 800m and won the silver medal in the T11 5000m and gold medal in the T11 1500m.

References

Paralympic athletes of Morocco
Athletes (track and field) at the 2004 Summer Paralympics
Paralympic gold medalists for Morocco
Paralympic silver medalists for Morocco
Living people
Medalists at the 2004 Summer Paralympics
Year of birth missing (living people)
Paralympic medalists in athletics (track and field)
Moroccan male middle-distance runners
Moroccan male long-distance runners